Martin Meichelbeck (born 21 November 1976) is a German former professional footballer who played as a centre-back.

Career
Meichelbeck was born in Bamberg (Franconia). His first football club was FC Baunach. He played one season in the youth team of 1. FC Nürnberg. The next clubs were 1. FC Bamberg and SpVgg Jahn Forchheim.

Greuther Fürth
Meichelbeck started his professional career at 2. Bundesliga club SpVgg Greuther Fürth in 1998. At this point, he decided to start a professional football career. He was still studying medicine till that time. Meichelbeck played for Greuther Fürth until 2000.

VfL Bochum
In 2000, Meichelbeck moved to VfL Bochum. Meichelbeck is the player who has played the most matches for VfL Bochum in the 2007–08 squad. Highlights of this period are his one UEFA Cup match with VfL Bochum against Standard Liège and one match with the German Team 2006. He also relegated and promoted twice with his club. In his professional career, Meichelbeck has gotten only one red card.

Return to Greuther Fürth
In 2008 Meichelbeck return to SpVgg Greuther Fürth for two seasons.

Personal life
Meichelbeck studied Social Behaviour Science at the FernUniversität Hagen. He had ten years of piano lessons and is still a devoted piano player in his free time.

Career statistics

References

External links
 

1976 births
Living people
German footballers
Association football central defenders
Germany B international footballers
SpVgg Greuther Fürth players
VfL Bochum players
VfL Bochum II players
Bundesliga players
2. Bundesliga players
Sportspeople from Bamberg
Footballers from Bavaria